Señorita Panamá 1998, the 16th Señorita Panamá pageant and 33rd celebration of the Miss Panamá contest, was held in Teatro Anayansi Centro de Convenciones Atlapa, Panama City, Panama, on Saturday, September 5, 1998, after weeks of events. The winner of the pageant was Yamani Saied.

The pageant was broadcast live on RPC-TV Panamá. About 14 contestants from all over Panamá competed for the prestigious crown. At the conclusion of the final night of competition, outgoing titleholder Tanisha Tamara Drummond Jonhson of Colon crowned Yamani Esther Saied Calviño of Panama Centro as the new Señorita Panamá.

In the same night was celebrated the election of the "Señorita Panamá World",  was announced the winner of the Señorita Panamá Mundo title. Señorita Panamá World 1997 Patricia Aurora Bremner Hernández of Panama Centro crowned Lorena del Carmen Zagía Miró of Panama Centro as the new Señorita Panamá World. Also was selected the representative for the Miss Asia Pacific pageant Abimelec Rodríguez Fernández of Panama Centro was crowned by Iris Avila Moreno Nuestra Belleza Internacional Panamá 1997 of Panama Centro.

Saied competed in the 48th edition, Miss Universe 1999 pageant, held at the Chaguaramas Convention Centre, Chaguaramas, Trinidad and Tobago on May 26, 1999.

In other hands Zagía Miró competed in Miss World 1998, the 48th edition of the Miss World pageant, was held on 26 November 1998 at the Lake Berjaya Mahé Resort in Mahé Island, Seychelles. Rodríguez competed in Miss Asia Pacific 1999 pageant, the 29th edition of Miss Asia Pacific Pageant held on December 11, 1999 in Quezon City Philippines, where she won the Best National Costume.

Final result

Special awards

Contestants 
These are the competitors who have been selected this year.

Election schedule

Saturday September 5 Final night, coronation Señorita Panamá 1998

Candidates notes

Yamani Saied considered one of the most delicate and beautiful Señorita Panama.

Historical significance

Panamá Centro won Señorita Panamá for 19th time.

References

External links
  Señorita Panamá  official website

Señorita Panamá
1998 beauty pageants